Lewis Eliphalet Parsons (April 28, 1817–June 8, 1895) was the appointed provisional and 19th Governor of Alabama from June to December 1865, following the American Civil War.

Parsons was Alabama's 19th governor. He was born in Broome County, New York, on April 28, 1817. He was educated in public schools and studied law at the Frederick Tallmadge office in New York and the G.W. Woodward offices in Pennsylvania. Parsons moved to Talladega, Alabama, in 1840 and practiced law with Alexander White. He was a presidential elector in 1856 and 1860 and a member of the Alabama House of Representatives in 1859 and 1865. Parsons fought as a Confederate lieutenant at the brief Battle of Munford near Talladega in April 1865.

In April 1865, Alabama's civil government changed drastically because of the Confederate States Army's surrender. General George H. Thomas was ordered to manage state affairs until a provisional government was appointed. President Andrew Johnson appointed Parsons provisional governor of Alabama on June 21, 1865. His first deed was to reinstate the laws of 1861, except those about slavery. He ordered the election of delegates to a constitutional convention that met on September 12, 1865. The convention repealed the ordinance of secession, renounced the state's war debts, abolished slavery, and scheduled elections to choose state officials and representatives to Congress. He attempted to purchase the panhandle of Florida for Alabama, which sparked rumors that he had access to unclaimed confederate gold. Parsons's term ended on December 13, 1865, with the inauguration of Robert M. Patton. Parsons was elected to the U.S. Senate but was refused his seat by the Republican Party. In addition, he served as U.S. District Attorney for northern Alabama.

Memoirs of the Civil War 
One of Parsons' most memorable lectures was made in New York after he visited the devastated city of Selma, Alabama, immediately following the war in 1865:

Death and burial
Parsons died on June 8, 1895, and is buried in the Oak Hill Cemetery, Talladega, Alabama.

Family
Parsons' son Lewis E. Parsons Jr. (1846-1916) served as United States Attorney for the Northern District of Alabama. His grandson, James K. Parsons was a career United States Army officer who attained the rank of major general and received the Distinguished Service Cross for heroism in World War I.

References

 Sobel, Robert, and John Raimo, eds. Biographical Directory of the Governors of the United States, 1789–1978, Vol.1, Westport, Conn.; Meckler Books, 1978. 4 vols.

1817 births
1895 deaths
Democratic Party members of the Alabama House of Representatives
Democratic Party governors of Alabama
Confederate States Army officers
People of Alabama in the American Civil War
People from Talladega, Alabama
People from Lisle, New York
19th-century American politicians